Comedy Showroom is an Australian television comedy anthology series that began airing in May 2016 on ABC. The six new comedies screened in the series are seen as possible pilots for a full TV series.

Ronny Chieng: International Student won a full season which aired on the ABC in Australia in June 2017 and later on Comedy Central in the US. The Letdown won a full season for the ABC in Australia and on Netflix in the US.

Episodes

Ronny Chieng: International Student
Ronny Chieng shares his experiences as an international student.
 Ronny Chieng as himself
 Molly Daniels as Asher
 Dave Eastgate as Mick
 Hoa Xuande as Elvin
 Anthony Morgan as Professor Dale
 Laurence Boxhall as Daniel
 Linda Schragger as Mrs. Chieng 
 Gareth Yuen as Denedict
 Shuang Hu as Wei-Jun
 Felicity Ward as Post-Grad Student
 Tim Potter as Librarian
 Quin Ellery as Nicholas
 Brenton Cosier as James
 Daniel Di Giovanni as Alexander
 Aaron Gocs as Streaker
 John Campbell as Waiter
 Ryder Jack as Hipster

The Letdown
Audrey struggles as a new mum in an oddball mothers' group.
 Alison Bell as Audrey
 Duncan Fellows
 Noni Hazlehurst as Ambrose
 Sacha Horler as Ester
 Lucy Durack as Sophie
 Leon Ford as Ruben
 Celeste Barber as Barbara
 Taylor Ferguson as Jenna
 Leah Vandenberg as Martha
 Xana Tang
 Sarah Peirse

The Legend of Gavin Tanner
The desperate attempts of a deadbeat weed dealer to win his new neighbour's affections.

The Future is Expensive
Eddie Perfect's absurd suburban life.

Bleak
Kate McLennan plays Anna O'Brien a woman who hits rock bottom in life and love after losing her job, boyfriend and home in one day.

Moonman
Lawrence Mooney discovering what it takes for a 40-something-year-old man to finally grow up.

References

External links
 
 
 
 
 
 

Australian Broadcasting Corporation original programming
Australian comedy television series
2016 Australian television series debuts
English-language television shows